Back to School is a 1986 American comedy film starring Rodney Dangerfield, Keith Gordon, Sally Kellerman, Burt Young, Terry Farrell, William Zabka, Ned Beatty, Sam Kinison, Paxton Whitehead, Robert Downey Jr., and Adrienne Barbeau. It was directed by Alan Metter. The plot centers on a wealthy but uneducated father (Dangerfield) who goes to college to show solidarity with his discouraged son Jason (Gordon) and learns that he cannot buy an education or happiness.

Author Kurt Vonnegut has a cameo as himself, as does the band Oingo Boingo, whose frontman Danny Elfman composed the score for the film. The University of Wisconsin–Madison was used as a backdrop for the movie, although it was called "Grand Lakes University". The diving scenes were filmed at the since-demolished Industry Hills Aquatic Club in the City of Industry, California.

Before the end credits, the message "For ESTELLE Thanks For So Much" is shown in dedication to Estelle Endler, one of the executive producers of the film, who died during production. She was Dangerfield's long-time manager, who helped him get into films such as Caddyshack.

Plot
Thornton Meloni, a child of Italian immigrants, returns from school one day to his father's tailor shop, bearing a report card with poor grades. His ambition is to go into his father's line of work, but his stern father warns Thornton "If a man has no education, he's got nothing".

As decades pass, Thornton changes his last name to the more Americanized "Melon" and becomes a self-made corporate giant, with a successful chain of plus-size clothing stores and numerous other business ventures. He becomes a widower, and remarries to a gold-digging socialite named Vanessa. Feeling dejected when his college student son Jason cancels a visit, he returns home to a party hosted by Vanessa. Finally weary of Vanessa's nasty attitude and adultery, Thornton divorces her, and asks his bodyguard and chauffeur Lou to drive him up to the college to visit Jason.

On the campus, Thornton learns from Jason that he is C-student, unhappy with college life and intends to drop out. He is a towel boy for the diving team instead of a member, was rejected by the fraternities, is antagonized by diver and jock Chas Osborne, and has no friends except for his roommate Derek Lutz. Thornton motivates him to stay in college by deciding to enroll alongside him. Despite Thornton's lack of academic qualifications, the dean David Martin admits him when he bribes Martin with a donation for a new campus building.

Thornton's bribery earns him the wrath of Dr. Philip Barbay, dean of the business school. His displeasure is further exacerbated by Thornton's canny practical experience clashing with Barbay's hypothetical theorizing in class, and ivory tower ways. Thornton also develops a romantic interest in Barbay's girlfriend, the literature professor Dr. Diane Turner. Meanwhile, Jason begins to attract the interest of Valerie Desmond, a girl that Chas has been trying to impress. Thornton instantly becomes a popular man on campus, throwing huge parties and exhibiting generosity to the fellow students. Jason earns a spot on the diving team, after Thornton, a former diver himself, convinces the diving coach to reconsider his abilities. Despite all this, Jason still feels he is living in his father's shadow.

As a student, even though Diane is inspiring a deeper appreciation of literature, Thornton prefers partying to studying. He hires a team of professionals to complete his assignments, including author Kurt Vonnegut to write a paper on Vonnegut for literature class. To Thornton's surprise, Diane gives the paper a failing grade for obviously not being his own work, and she becomes disillusioned by his frivolous behavior. Jason is also upset with Thornton for trivializing education, while mistakenly believing Thornton bribed the diving coach into accepting him on the team.

Dr. Barbay accuses Thornton, in the presence of Dean Martin, of academic fraud. He challenges Thornton to an oral examination conducted by all of his professors, facing expulsion if he fails any part of it. Believing he has no chance of passing, Thornton packs up and prepares to leave. Jason stops Thornton and successfully encourages him to stay and prepare for the challenge.

With limited time to prepare, Thornton crams for the examination with help from Jason, Derek, Lou, and Diane. When the big day comes, Barbay begins by intimidating Thornton with a single, 27-part question. Nevertheless, Thornton answers every part, though the effort was so much that he wants to forfeit. Diane inspires him to finish, and he does.

At the championship dive meet later that day, Thornton and Jason reconcile, while Jason's team takes the lead. To spite Jason for his performance and for winning over Valerie, Chas fakes a cramp in an attempt to make his team lose. The coach decides to recruit Thornton as a last-minute replacement. Thornton helps the team win by performing the legendary "Triple Lindy" dive. Afterwards, Thornton learns from Diane that he has passed the examination with all D's, except for a single A from her. At the end of the school year, Thornton gives the commencement speech, advising the new graduates to move back in with their parents.

Cast
 Rodney Dangerfield as Thornton Melon
 Sally Kellerman as Dr. Diane Turner
 Burt Young as Lou
 Keith Gordon as Jason Melon
 Robert Downey Jr. as Derek Lutz
 Paxton Whitehead as Dr. Phillip Barbay
 Sam Kinison as Professor Terguson
 Terry Farrell as Valerie Desmond
 M. Emmet Walsh as Coach Turnbull
 Adrienne Barbeau as Vanessa Melon
 William Zabka as Chas Osborne
 Ned Beatty as Dean Martin
 Severn Darden as Dr. Borozini
 Robert Picardo as Giorgio
 Jason Hervey as Young Thornton
 Edie McClurg as Marge Sweetwater
 Kurt Vonnegut as himself (cameo)
 Danny Elfman as himself (cameo)

Production
Harold Ramis suggested a rewrite to the script. The producers originally wanted Jim Carrey to play the role of Professor Terguson, but he was later rejected as he was deemed too young for the part.

Reception
Back to School was the 6th highest-grossing film of 1986, as well as the second highest grossing comedy film of the year, behind Crocodile Dundee (records state that in addition to the rental and theatrical gross it received, it went on to gross $108,634,920 globally).

On Rotten Tomatoes, the film holds an 86% rating based on 37 reviews, with an average rating of 6.90/10. The site's consensus reads, "Back to School gives Rodney Dangerfield plenty of room to riff -- and supports the freewheeling funnyman with enough of a story to keep things interesting between punchlines." On Metacritic it has a score of 68 out of 100 based on reviews from 9 critics, indicating "generally favorable reviews". Audiences polled by CinemaScore gave the film an average grade of "A−" on an A+ to F scale.

Kevin Thomas of the Los Angeles Times noted that "Dangerfield seems to be setting the film's brisk pace and flawless timing himself." Nina Darnton wrote in The New York Times that "the film is a good-natured potpourri of gags, funny bits, populist sentiment and anti-intellectualism." Roger Ebert's Chicago Sun-Times 3-star review described the film as "routine but pleasant", yet elevated by Dangerfield's persona: "This is exactly the sort of plot Marx or Fields could have appeared in. Dangerfield brings it something they might also have brought along: a certain pathos."

Soundtrack

The soundtrack was released on MCA, available in LP or Cassette (no CD), but cues from the score were released that year with selections from the score of Pee-wee's Big Adventure (both re-recordings made in London) on CD.

In popular culture
The competition scene was parodied in the music video for Canadian rock band Sum 41's 2001 single "In Too Deep".

See also
 High Time
 List of American films of 1986

References

External links

 
 
 
 
 

1986 films
1980s sports comedy films
1980s teen comedy films
American sports comedy films
American teen comedy films
1980s English-language films
Films scored by Danny Elfman
Films set in universities and colleges
Films shot in California
Films shot in Wisconsin
Orion Pictures films
Films with screenplays by Harold Ramis
Films with screenplays by Rodney Dangerfield
Films with screenplays by Steven Kampmann
Swimming films
University of Wisconsin–Madison
Films with screenplays by PJ Torokvei
Films directed by Alan Metter
1986 comedy films
1980s American films